Raymond Llewellyn (also known as Ray Llewellyn) born 15 August 1928,,(in Newport, Wales), is a Welsh actor.

His earliest major role was in the original West End production of Under Milk Wood, playing Mr Pugh in 1956. He is also known for his role as Huw in the cult fantasy series The Owl Service. Llewellyn stated that these two parts have been the standout roles in his career.

He also appeared in the Doctor Who story "The Abominable Snowmen" in 1967 and the 1978 film The Thief of Bagdad. He has also worked for the Royal Shakespeare Company.

Recent work includes parts in TV dramas Holby City and Doctors. He also played the role of Madoc in the TV series Cadfael with Derek Jacobi.

Other work includes Mr Pugh in the 1963 BBC Radio version of Under Milk Wood with Richard Burton; 1984-5 in New York/Washington and three weeks in Los Angeles with 'Cyrano' & Much Ado About Nothing starring Derek Jacobi, as well as ten weeks in Los Angeles with the Royal National Theatre Production of Henrik Ibsen's An Enemy of the People starring Ian McKellen. He played in three seasons at the Ludlow Festival Shakespeare productions directed by Michael Bogdanov. His last work before his retirement was in the film The Edge of Love, about an incident in the life of Dylan Thomas, with Keira Knightley.

References

External links 

1928 births
Living people
Welsh male film actors
Welsh male television actors